Mouli may refer to:

People

Samuel "Mouli" Cohen (born 1958), Israeli entrepreneur
Mouli Ganguly (born 1982), Indian actress in Hindi and Bengali cinema
T. S. B. K. Moulee, Indian film director and actor
Rama Chandra Mouli (born 1950), Indian writer
Surya Prashant Mouli (born 1996), Indian accountant.

Other uses
Mauli (thread), a Hindu ritual item
Mouli grater, a kitchen utensil
Mouli Island, one of the Loyalty Islands in New Caledonia
Mouli, Punjab, a village in Phagwara tehsil, Punjab, India
mooli, sometimes spelled mouli or moolie, an Indian white radish.

See also
Moulis (disambiguation)